Auqui (possibly from Quechua for prince; a mythical figure of the Andean culture; grandfather) is a mountain in the Cordillera Blanca in the Andes of Peru, about  high. It is situated in the Ancash Region, Huari Province, Huari District. Auqui lies southeast of Jacabamba.

References

Mountains of Peru
Mountains of Ancash Region